Mandolin Brothers is a musical instrument shop in New York City.

Overview
Mandolin Brothers is located in Staten Island, New York.  Its clients have included Bob Dylan, Joni Mitchell, Paul Simon and Paul McCartney'.

Mandolin Brothers is listed on The New York Music Trail a map of the "Sites of Sound" established by the City of New York and The Host Committee for the Grammy Awards, as a destination for visitors.

History
Mandolin Brothers was established in 1971 by Stan Jay and Harold "Hap" Kuffner.  Kuffner left Mandolin Brothers in 1982.  The name was chosen by the store's founders as they thought that the mandolin was not getting due recognition in the community.

References

External links
 Mandolin Brothers Website
 Video discussion about Mandolins by Smoke Music TV at Mandolin Brothers
 photograph of Stan Jay President
 Forbes.com page on Mandolin Brothers
 Fairport Conventions Chris Leslie's discussion of his visit to Mandolin Brothers
 WNYC's SoundCheck Visit Staten Island and Mandolin Brothers July 24, 2003
 WNYC's Soundcheck speaks with Mandolin Brother's Stan Jay and Gruhn Guitars's George Gruhn about vintage guitars June 1, 2007
 Gruhn Guitars
 outside.in travel guide
  Gibson Guitar Profile of Mandolin Brothers
 The New York Observer July 15, 2008 article "The Local: Mandolin 'Mecca' on Staten Island"
 Insiderpages profile
 Photographs of Mandolin Brothers
 June 21, 2012 WNYC blog profile on Mandolin.
 Profile from WFUV July 16, 2012 of Mandolin Brothers
 Founder Stan Jay obituary from Staten Island Live.com

Musical instrument retailers of the United States
Shops in New York City
Companies based in Staten Island
1971 establishments in New York City